The Chennai Marathon is an annual marathon held in Chennai, India. The event is organised by the Chennai Runners, and is one of the few events in the state to be endorsed by the Sports Development Authority of Tamil Nadu (SDAT).

Starting at the Napier Bridge in Marina Beach and terminating at the Annai Velankanni Church on Elliot's Beach, it is considered South India's largest city marathon, in which over 1,000 athletes and more than 20,000 amateurs participate. The event has three categories: full Marathon, half marathon, and the most popular, the 10 km race.

The 2023 edition will be held on 08 Jan 2023 and an expected 20,000 competitors would be participating. The event is sponsored by Freshworks.

Results

Full Marathon: Men

Full Marathon: Women

Half Marathon: Men

Half Marathon: Women

Victories by nationality

References

External links 
 Running Races in India
 Official website
 Snapshots from the Chennai Marathon 2005

Marathons in India
Marathon
Recurring sporting events established in 2012
2012 establishments in Tamil Nadu